Mount Durnford is a mountain,  high, standing  southeast of Mount Field in the Churchill Mountains of Antarctica. It was discovered and named "Durnford Bluff" by the British National Antarctic Expedition, 1901–04, for Admiral Sir John Durnford, a Junior Naval Lord who was of assistance to the expedition. The New Zealand Geological Survey Antarctic Expedition (1960–61) remapped the feature and amended the name to Mount Durnford.

References 

Mountains of Oates Land